Alexander Hamilton Jr./Sr. High School (AHHS) is a public, six-year middle and secondary school in Elmsford, New York, United States. It is the only public junior and senior high school in the Elmsford School District.

Demographics
The makeup of the school is 36% African American, 45% Hispanic or Latino, 11% White, and 9% Asian or Native Hawaiian/other Pacific Islander. Fifty-seven percent of the teachers have either a master's degree plus 30 credits or a doctoral degree.

Honors and distinctions
In 1993 the school was selected as a United States Blue Ribbon School of Excellence, and in 1996 it was named one of the nation's 150 outstanding high schools by Redbook magazine.

Extracurricular activities
The school has the following clubs:

Athletics
Alexander Hamilton competes in Section 1 (NYSPHSAA) of the New York State Public High School Athletic Association.

V = Varsity, JV = Junior varsity, Mod = Modified

References

Public high schools in Westchester County, New York
Public middle schools in Westchester County, New York
Educational institutions established in 1929
Greenburgh, New York
1929 establishments in New York (state)